Champ is an LP by Tokyo Police Club that was released on June 8, 2010. Champ is the band's second studio album, after the release of Elephant Shell in 2008. Tokyo Police Club released the album's first single, "Breakneck Speed" for free download on their website on March 26, 2010. The next singles released off the album were "Wait Up (Boots of Danger)" followed by "Gone".

Reception

As with their debut EP, A Lesson In Crime, Champ was met with a mixed to positive press response, being lauded for their upbeat consistency from one album to the next. Slant Magazine gave it 3/5 stars, calling the band "smart guys with ambitions to be more than another forgotten blog band". Similarly Rolling Stone gave them 3.5/5 stars, praising the way they fused "light-speed guitars with ebullient melodies", saying, "Rarely has crafting such high-velocity guitar pop seemed so easy."

Track listing
All songs by Monks, Wright, Hook, and Alsop.

Personnel 
Tokyo Police Club

 Dave Monks – songwriting, musician
 Graham Wright – songwriting, musician
 Josh Hook – songwriting, musician
 Greg Alsop – songwriting, musician

Technical

 Rob Schnapf  – producer, mix engineer
 Doug Boehm – engineer, mix engineer
 Chris Szczech – assistant mix engineer

 Clinton Welander – assistant engineer
 Chris Claypool – assistant engineer
 Zac Carper – assistant engineer
 Alan Yoshida – mastering
 Chris Zane – additional production (track 1)
 Dean Marino – additional engineering (track 11)
 Jay Sadlowski – additional engineering (track 11)

Art and management

 Rich Cohen – management
 Nous Vous – design and art direction
 Tom Jackson – photography

References

External links
Tokyo Police Club official website

2010 albums
Tokyo Police Club albums
Mom + Pop Music albums
Albums produced by Rob Schnapf
Albums recorded at Kingsize Soundlabs